Paula P-Orridge (born Paula Jean Brooking, 23 February 1963), also known as Alaura O'Dell, is an English musician, writer, and entrepreneur.

Career
P-Orridge's musical career began in 1979 when she met musician and artist Genesis P-Orridge while working at a Tesco supermarket in Hackney, East London.

Prior to meeting Genesis she had had some connection to the Industrial Records music scene and had performed onstage with band 23 Skidoo. Genesis was a member of seminal band Throbbing Gristle, an originator of industrial music and an influential figure in the development of post-punk and electronica. Prior to Throbbing Gristle's last show, Paula married Genesis in Tijuana, Mexico; they had two daughters, Caresse and Genesse.

1980s
Paula joined Genesis's band Psychic TV in 1983, playing drums and creating sound collages. She was also responsible for running the mail order section of Temple Records, and at times acted as Psychic TV's tour manager and record company liaison.

1990s
In the early 1990s, Paula and Genesis left the United Kingdom to live in Nepal and the United States in a self-imposed exile, during which the couple divorced.

In 1995 while in the United States, Paula released a solo ambient music and spoken word album, Sacred Dreams, on the San Francisco-based record label, Silent Records. Sacred Dreams differed significantly from her previous work and she released the album under her new name of Alaura O'Dell.

The Sacred Dreams album was recorded in December 1994 in collaboration with Justin Beck, a Californian electronica artist. The album was also the debut of P-Orridge's new interest in spirituality and new-age mysticism. Sacred Dreams has been re-released on Justin Beck's label, Sanctioned Records as an mp3.

To complement her interest in New Age Goddess worship, in 1996 Paula P-Orridge/ Alaura O'Dell established an independent, niche travel company, Sacred Journeys for Womyn. The company offers educational, experiential and healing tours exclusively to women, visiting sites of significance revered for a tradition of Goddess worship.

Discography

Song
"Magik" on compilation album, Sanctioned Records – The Electronica Sound of Sonoma County Northern California Vol. 1 (2006)

Albums
 Sacred Dreams (1995)

References

1963 births
Living people
English new-age musicians
English electronic musicians
Place of birth missing (living people)
British women drummers
English drummers
People from Westminster
English women in electronic music